Big Bear City Airport  is a high-elevation public airport, operated by the Big Bear Airport District, located in the San Bernardino Mountains in Big Bear City, California, United States.

Facilities and aircraft 

In 2004, the airport had 30,000 aircraft operations, an average of 82 per day: 93% general aviation and 7% military. There are 141 aircraft based at this airport: 94% single engine, 3% multi-engine, 2% ultralight and 1% glider.

The Barnstorm Restaurant in the terminal building serves German-American cuisine and is open every day from 7am to 3pm for breakfast and lunch.  It is open from 5pm to 9pm Thursday through Sunday for dinner.

Specific flight rules 

Big Bear City Airport has published specific flight rules for aircraft. At the time of writing, the established procedure is for inbound traffic to fly in over the ski slopes at 9,500 feet, and for departing traffic to fly at or below 8,500 feet. As this airport is at fairly high altitude and routinely experiences density altitudes of 9,000 feet or higher, it is important (perhaps more than usual) for pilots to double-check the performance tables in their aircraft manuals to ensure that they will be able to take off. The flight rules also contain noise abatement procedures that help the airport, its tenants, and its guests to be better neighbors to the community.

The calm wind runway (26) ends at the eastern terminus of Big Bear Lake. There is no suitable landing area for several miles, as the terrain is covered almost completely with coniferous trees and houses. If an airplane can make it over the lake and past the dam, its pilot will enjoy "instant altitude" - there is a deep fissure between mountain ridges that leads roughly south towards San Bernardino. One must be cautious of possible turbulence and mountain wave/rotor activity in this area, but aside from that, it is an option for pilots who are having trouble climbing or maintaining altitude.

Historical airline service 

In 1988, Alpha Air, a commuter airline based in southern California which subsequently became a Trans World Express air carrier flying on behalf of TWA, was operating nonstop service from the airport to Los Angeles International Airport (LAX).

References

External links
Big Bear City Airport (official site)

Airports in San Bernardino County, California
Big Bear Valley
San Bernardino Mountains